Jennifer Lynn Suhr (née Stuczynski; born February 5, 1982) is an American former pole vaulter. She has been an Olympic and World champion, has been ranked #1 in the World, has been the #1 American pole vaulter since 2006, and has won a total of 17 US National Championships (7 Indoor, 10 Outdoor). She holds the American women's pole vault record indoors. She won the gold medal at the London Olympics on August 6, 2012. Track & Field News named her American Female Athlete of the Year for 2008.

Biography
Suhr was born to Mark and Sue Stuczynski, grocery store owners in Fredonia, New York. The grocery store was previously owned by her grandfather, "Bunk" Stuczynski. She got involved in sports at a young age, playing softball at age 6. At 9, she competed in an adult golf league with her grandfather. At Fredonia High School, she played softball, basketball, soccer, and track and field, and won the New York State pentathlon title in 2000 as a senior.

Suhr attended Roberts Wesleyan University in Rochester, New York, where she competed in basketball and track and field. She averaged 24.3 points and 6.7 rebounds a game for Roberts Wesleyan in 2003–04, taking her team to the NCCAA national championship game. She graduated as the school’s all-time leading scorer in basketball with 1,819 points.

On January 3, 2010, Jenn married her coach, Rick Suhr, in Rochester.

Pole vaulting career

2004
Jenn began pole vaulting with coach Rick Suhr.

2005
In the 2005 USA Indoor Championships in Boston, Jenn Stuczynski entered as an unknown, unseeded competitor and won the US title having only trained for 10 months. She went on to set three personal bests, eventually clearing  on her first attempt to leapfrog from a tie for third. Later that indoor season she won the NAIA indoor national title in the pole vault.

2006
Suhr began her career with her coach Rick Suhr providing financial support to her by re-mortgaging his home. She finished third at the 2006 World Athletics Final.

2007
Suhr won the USA Indoor Track & Field Championships in Boston on February 25, 2007.

Two weeks later, at the Reebok Grand Prix on June 2, 2007, Suhr cleared , breaking the American record for a second time and becoming the second highest vaulter in history behind Russian Yelena Isinbayeva. Suhr then attempted a new world record vault of  – one centimeter higher than Isinbayeva's record at the time – but failed on three attempts at the height.

Competing in her first major global championship, Suhr finished in 10th place in the final, with a  clearance.

2008
Suhr won the Indoor U.S. Nationals, which qualified her for the 2008 IAAF World Indoor Championships – Women's pole vault in Valencia, Spain, where she finished second on a countback to Yelena Isinbayeva. Both cleared .

At the Adidas Track Classic on May 18, 2008, Suhr cleared , breaking her own American record. The U.S. Olympic Committee named her its female athlete of the month for May.

At the U.S. Olympic Trials on July 6, 2008, Suhr cleared , winning the trials and breaking her own American record.

At the Aviva Grand Prix on July 25, 2008, two women attempted the world record in the same meet for the first time. Both Suhr and Isinbayeva were unsuccessful.

At the Olympics in Beijing on August 18, 2008, Suhr finished second to Isinbayeva, clearing . Suhr finished with the silver medal and credited her coach Rick Suhr for his strict regimen in preparing her for the competitiveness and high stress of the Olympics.

2009
She set a new American record on February 7, 2009, at the Boston Indoor Games when she cleared .

On July 1, 2009, she cleared  at the 2009 USA Outdoor Track and Field Championships in Oregon to win another American title. Suhr was forced to withdraw from the US team for the 2009 world championships in Berlin with an Achilles tendon injury.

2010
It was her fifth consecutive US outdoor title and was the best mark by any woman vaulter in the world for 2010.

2011
Her run of five consecutive national outdoor titles was ended by Kylie Hutson at the USA Outdoor Track and Field Championships, with Suhr finishing in second place with a  vault.

Suhr cleared  – the highest vault of the year – in Rochester, New York on July 26.

Suhr also took Diamond League victories in London and Zurich during the season, defeating 2011 world champion Fabiana Murer and three other former world champions in the latter competition.

Track & Field News ranked Suhr the number one women's pole vaulter in the world for 2011.

2012
She opened 2012 with an American record clearance of 4.88 m at the Boston Indoor Grand Prix, re-establishing herself as the second highest female vaulter of all-time. She won the USATF Indoor Championships in Albequerque on Feb 25 with a vault of 4.63.  A meet record of 4.65 m followed in the outdoor season at the Drake Relays in April.

On June 24, Suhr won the Olympic Trials (and the United States Championships) to qualify for her second Olympic games.

On August 6, 2012, Jenn Suhr won the gold medal in the women's pole vault at the Olympic Games, defeating Cuba's Yarisley Silva on countback after both competitors had cleared 4.75 m.

2013
On March 2, 2013, Suhr broke Yelena Isinbayeva's world indoor record (set on February 23, 2012, in Stockholm) at the USA Indoor Track & Field Championships in Albuquerque, New Mexico, with a vault of 5.02m (16 ft. 5.5 in.), becoming the 2nd woman in history to vault over 5 meters.

2014

2015

2016

Suhr won the 2016 USA Olympic Trials and competed in the 2016 Summer Olympics in Rio de Janeiro, Brazil. She came down with a severe illness prior to the competition, and although she passed through the first day of qualifying without a problem, she finished in seventh place, below initial expectations. Doctors were never able to identify the cause of Suhr's symptoms.

2022
Suhr announced her retirement in June 2022. Over the course of her career, Jenn Suhr won 17 USA National Championships, 7 indoor and 10 outdoor which included every outdoor national championship from 2006 to 2016 except for 2011.

Sponsorship
In 2006 Suhr signed a 4-year sponsorship with Adidas. In August 2007, Suhr was signed as a brand spokesperson for Nutrilite, a brand of vitamin, mineral and dietary supplements.

Awards and honors
Track & Field News named Suhr the American Female Athlete of the Year for 2008. No male vaulter has ever won the American honor and the only other female winner was Stacy Dragila in 2001.

See also
 Five metres club

References

External links
 
 
 
 
 
 

1982 births
Living people
People from Fredonia, New York
Track and field athletes from New York (state)
American female pole vaulters
Olympic gold medalists for the United States in track and field
Olympic silver medalists for the United States in track and field
Athletes (track and field) at the 2008 Summer Olympics
Athletes (track and field) at the 2012 Summer Olympics
Athletes (track and field) at the 2016 Summer Olympics
Medalists at the 2008 Summer Olympics
Medalists at the 2012 Summer Olympics
Pan American Games medalists in athletics (track and field)
Athletes (track and field) at the 2015 Pan American Games
World Athletics Championships athletes for the United States
World Athletics Championships medalists
Roberts Wesleyan University alumni
American people of Polish descent
Pan American Games bronze medalists for the United States
World Athletics indoor record holders
USA Outdoor Track and Field Championships winners
USA Indoor Track and Field Championships winners
World Athletics Indoor Championships winners
Medalists at the 2015 Pan American Games
21st-century American women